Koi Peak is a peak rising to about  at the intersection of the ridges at the head of Doran Glacier in the Kukri Hills of Victoria Land. Koi is a Māori name given by the New Zealand Geographic Board in 1998, meaning "sharp" peak.

References

Mountains of Victoria Land